This is a list of noteworthy privately owned public spaces in London, England.

Open spaces 
 Athletes Village, London
 Bishops Square, Spitalfields
 Broadgate
 Brown Hart Gardens
 Canary Wharf
 Cardinal Place, Victoria
 Central St Giles
 More London
 Excel Centre, Royal Victoria Docks
 Hay's Galleria
 King's Cross Central — but note that Camden Council has adopted the streets and public areas
 the London Eye
 Nine Elms
 Queen Elizabeth Olympic Park
 Paddington Waterside
 Paternoster Square
 Regent's Place
 Rochester Square
 Tower Bridge
 Westfield Stratford City

References 

London
privately owned public spaces